Idiopyrgus souleyetianus is a species of freshwater snail with gills and an operculum, an aquatic gastropod mollusk in the family Tomichiidae. 

Idiopyrgus souleyetianus is the type species of the genus Idiopyrgus.

Distribution 
The distribution of Idiopyrgus souleyetianus includes Brazil.

References

External links
 Salvador, R. B.; Silva, F. S.; Bichuette, M. E. (2022). Phylogenetic position of the relict South American genus Idiopyrgus Pilsbry, 1911 (Gastropoda, Truncatelloidea), with the description of two new cave species. Zoosystematics and Evolution. 98(2): 365-375

Truncatelloidea
Gastropods described in 1911